Nanping–Fuzhou railway or Nanfu railway, is a railroad in eastern China between Nanping and Fuzhou in Fujian Province.

Other Names
Since 1956, the Nanping–Fuzhou railway has been referred to by at least four other names.  The railway branches off of the Yingtan–Xiamen railway at the Waiyang station, near Nanping and is also called the Waiyang–Fuzhou railway or Waifu railway.  The Waiyang Station is located in Laizhou, a township of Nanping Municipality, and the railway is also known as the Laizhou–Fuzhou railway or Laifu railway.  In 2006, the Ministry of Railways, after upgrading the line for higher speed train service, joined most of this line with the Hengfeng–Nanping railway to create the Hengfeng–Fuzhou railway or Hengfu railway. A short section of the line between the Waiyang station and Nanping station is now known as the Waiyang–Nanping railway or Wainan railway.

History
The Nanping–Fuzhou railway was built between 1956 and 1959 using surplus funds and labor from the Yingtan–Xiamen railway.  In 1956, as the Yingxia railway, the first railroad built in Fujian Province, was nearing completion ahead of schedule, the deputy governor of Fujian Liang Lingguang suggested using the leftover funds and manpower to build another railway to the provincial capital Fuzhou.  The Fujian Party Secretary Ye Fei agreed with the proposal and secured the approval of General Wang Zhen.  The Nanping–Fuzhou railway was completed by January 1959, and was the first railway connecting Fuzhou with the rest of China’s railway network.

The single-track railway was electrified in 2000.

When the high-speed Xiangtang–Putian railway opened in 2013, it made possible much faster passenger service between Fuzhou and the interior of the country. Most of the passenger service between Fuzhou and Nanchang (and other points further north and west) has been shifted from the Nanping–Fuzhou railway to the new line, the older railway only keeping a comparatively small number of slower trains.

Rail connections
Nanping: Hengfeng–Nanping railway
 Fuzhou: Wenzhou–Fuzhou railway, Fuzhou–Xiamen railway, Xiangtang–Putian railway

See also

 List of railways in China

References

Railway lines in China
Rail transport in Fujian
Fuzhou
Nanping
Railway lines opened in 1959